Connerton is a census-designated place in Pasco County, Florida, United States, off U.S. 41. Its population was 5,282 as of the 2020 census. Connerton Elementary was constructed in the area.

The Conner family owned and operated Conner Ranch, a working cattle ranch set on the 8,000 acres that now makes up Connerton.  The family sold the land in early 2000 to a developer who originally planned to build more than 15,000 homes and up to three golf courses.  The original plan was later modified to protect much of the natural lands.  Development began a couple years later with the first homes being sold in 2005.  The development was stunted with the downturn in the housing market, after a small portion of the full scale residential development was built out. As of 2012 construction plans were once again moving ahead.

Demographics

References

Census-designated places in Pasco County, Florida
Census-designated places in Florida
Planned communities in Florida